The A. C. Subba Reddy Government Medical College is located in Nellore district of Andhra Pradesh. It was established in  2014 with an intake capacity of 150 (MBBS seats). It is affiliated to Dr. NTR University of Health Sciences. The college was named after Anam Chenchu Subba Reddy, a veteran leader and former Municipal Chairman of Nellore district.

History 
The DSR District Headquarters Hospital, Nellore was built in 1963 to 1968.  Foundation Stone was laid by then Chief Minister of Andhra  Pradesh Sri Neelam Sanjeeva Reddy. It was inaugurated on 18 December 1968 by then Chief Minister of Karnataka Sri Veerendra Patil and preceded by then Chief Minister of Andhra Pradesh Sri Kasu Brahmananda Reddy.

Campus
The campus is spread across .

References

Colleges in India
Medical colleges in Andhra Pradesh
2014 establishments in Andhra Pradesh
Educational institutions established in 2014